Kenneth D. Jordan is an American chemist. He is currently the Richard King Mellon Professor and Distinguished Professor of Computational Chemistry at University of Pittsburgh and an Elected Fellow of the American Association for the Advancement of Science, American Chemical Society, Royal Society of Chemistry and American Physical Society.

References

Year of birth missing (living people)
Living people
Fellows of the American Association for the Advancement of Science
University of Pittsburgh faculty
21st-century American chemists
Fellows of the American Physical Society